{{DISPLAYTITLE:C18H20N2O3}}
The molecular formula C18H20N2O3 (molar mass: 312.36 g/mol) may refer to:

 25CN-NBOH
 ZK-93426 (ethyl-5-isopropoxy-4-methyl-beta-carboline-3-carboxylate)

Molecular formulas